The Kazakh State Academic Theater for Children and Youth named after G. Musrepov (Russian: Казахский государственный академический театр для детей и юношества имени Г. Мусрепова) is a theater for young spectators in Almaty, Kazakhstan, giving performances in the Kazakh language.

History 
The main initiator and the first director of the theater was Natalya Sats, who was in exile in Almaty.

Performances were initially staged in Russian; the Kazakh troupe was founded in 1946. The first performance in Kazakh was "Altyn kilt" (a translation of Aleksey Tolstoy's eponymous play). From 1946 to 1985 several dozen performances in the Kazakh language were staged.

In 1985, by Decree No. 50 of the Ministry of Culture of the Kazakh Soviet Socialist Republic, as of 24 February, the Theater for Children and Youth of Kazakhstan was divided into two independent companies: the Kazakh Theater, which was named after the Kazakh writer and playwright Gabit Musrepov, and the Russian Theater, which was named after Natalia Sats. In 1996 the theater was awarded the honorary title of an academic theater.

Architecture 

Construction started in 1957 and finished in 1962. The building stood on Comintern Square, and opposite A. Imanov Square.

The theater building was constructed in transiting style from classicist to functionalist traditions. It is a three-storey volume on a stylobate, with the main facade oriented to the west. The main entrance is accentuated by a deep loggia in the form of a stylized portico. The pediment is ornamented with a relief panel on Kazakh musical folklore theme. The wall planes of the side pylons and the loggia are partitioned in height by stained glass windows.

Heritage status 
On 10 November 2010, the new State List of Historical and Cultural Monuments of Local Significance in Almaty was approved, simultaneously with which all previous decisions on this subject were declared no longer valid. This decree retained the status of a monument of local importance of the theater building.

References 

Theatres in Almaty
Academic theatres
Theatres completed in 1946
1946 establishments in the Soviet Union